The 1988–89 Roller Hockey Champions Cup was the 25th edition of the Roller Hockey Champions Cup organized by CERH.

Noia achieved their first title ever.

Teams
The champions of the main European leagues and Liceo, as title holder, played this competition, consisting in a double-legged knockout tournament.

Bracket

Source:

References

External links
 CERH website

1988 in roller hockey
1989 in roller hockey
Rink Hockey Euroleague